Plantago bellardii is a species of annual herb in the family Plantaginaceae. They have a self-supporting growth form and simple, broad leaves. Individuals can grow to 4 cm tall.

Sources

References 

bellardi
Flora of Malta